Charles Jefferys (11 January 1807 – 9 June 1865, in London) was an English music publisher and composer of songs.

Career
Jefferys carried on a London music publishing business. In 1854 he won a legal action with Thomas Boosey, respecting copyright in Italian operas, after appeal to the House of Lords. He published A Book of Beauty for the Queen's Boudoir, a Musical Annual (1853, 1854) and seven numbers of Jeffery's Musical Journal in 1864.

He translated Victor Hugo's opera libretto La Esmeralda into English in 1856. He wrote the text for The Gipsy's Vengeance, an English version of Verdi's Il trovatore, performed at the Theatre Royal, Drury Lane in 1856, as well as an English version of Luisa Miller, performed at Sadler's Wells Theatre in 1858.

He also wrote the words of several popular songs, including "Rose of Allendale", "Mary of Argyle", and "Jeannett's Farewell to Jeannot", and himself composed "Rose Atherton", "Oh Erin, My Country!", and other songs.

References

External links

Sheet music for "Ah! I have sigh'd to rest me.", Macon, GA: John C. Schreiner & Son. From Confederate Imprints Sheet Music Collection.
IMSLP

1807 births
1865 deaths
19th-century English musicians
19th-century British translators
English lyricists
English music publishers (people)
English songwriters
English translators
French–English translators
19th-century English businesspeople